Located in Marysville, California, Ellis Lake is a man-made lake. The lake is bounded by 9th street to the South, B Street to the East, 14th Street to the North and D Street to the West.

History 
Ellis Lake was once a spillway of the Feather River. It wasn't until 1924 that the Women's Improvement Club of Marysville commissioned John McClaren, designer of the Golden Gate Park in San Francisco, to turn the swamp into a lake. The project was completed in 1939.
The lake was named for Marysville citizen W.T. Ellis, Jr..

Work on the lake was completed during the Great Depression through President Franklin Roosevelt's New Deal Plan.

Work included landscaping, construction of two tennis courts and a judging stand, a 20-ft. concrete and native stone bridge connecting the mainland with an island in the lake, a dock and boat landing 39, rubble rock electroliers for night illumination; and the installation of an ornamental fountain and rubble walls on the banks.

See also
List of lakes in California

References

Reservoirs in Yuba County, California
Marysville, California
Municipal parks in California
Reservoirs in Northern California
1939 establishments in California